= Gol Khedi =

- village
- Location within Madhya Pradesh Location within India
- Coordinates: 23.3711272°N 77.4027753°E
- Country: India
- State: Madhya Pradesh
- District: Bhopal
- Tehsil: Huzur
- Elevation: 488 m (1,601 ft)

Population (2011)
  - Total: 538
- Time zone: UTC+5:30 (IST)
- ISO 3166 code: MP-IN
- 2011 census code: 482389

Gol Khedi is a village in the Bhopal district of Madhya Pradesh, India. It is located in the Huzur tehsil and the Phanda block.

== Demographics ==
According to the 2011 census of India, Gol Khedi has 109 households. The effective literacy rate (i.e. the literacy rate of population excluding children aged 6 and below) is 66.74%.

Demographics (2011 Census)
	Total	Male	Female
Population	538	270	268
Children aged below 6 years	84	43	41
Scheduled caste	60	26	34
Scheduled tribe	33	18	15
Literates	303	179	124
Workers (all)	154	140	14
Main workers (total)	143	133	10
Main workers: Cultivators	60	58	2
Main workers: Agricultural labourers	44	39	5
Main workers: Household industry workers	8	8	0
Main workers: Other	31	28	3
Marginal workers (total)	11	7	4
Marginal workers: Cultivators	1	0	1
Marginal workers: Agricultural labourers	3	2	1
Marginal workers: Household industry workers	6	5	1
Marginal workers: Others	1	0	1
Non-workers	384	130	254
